"Tytöt tykkää" ("Girls Are Fond [of That]") is a Finnish-language song by Finnish pop singer Tea, released on  by EMI Finland as the lead single from her debut studio album Tytöt tykkää. The song peaked at number one on the Finnish Singles Chart in late July 2007 and has sold double platinum in the country with over 28,000 copies. Currently, the song ranks 26th on the list of the best-selling singles of all time in Finland.

Track listing
Digital download

Charts and certifications

Weekly charts

Year-end charts

Certifications

See also
List of best-selling singles in Finland

References

External links
 Official music video of "Tytöt tykkää" on YouTube

2007 debut singles
Finnish pop songs
Finnish-language songs
2007 songs